RCAF Station Assiniboia was a Second World War British Commonwealth Air Training Plan (BCATP) flying training station located near Assiniboia, Saskatchewan, Canada. It was operated and administered by the Royal Canadian Air Force (RCAF).

History

World War II
RCAF Station Assiniboia became the home station of the Royal Air Force's, No. 34 Elementary Flying Training School (No. 34 EFTS) on 11 Feb 1942. On 6 Jul 1942 the RAF turned over administration of the School to the Winnipeg Flying Club, operating as the Central Manitoba Flying Training School Ltd. who operated the school until No 34 EFTS was redesignated No. 25 EFTS on 30 January 1944. No. 25 EFTS was operated by the RCAF until it was disbanded on 28 July 1944.

No. 34 EFTS trained pilots using the Cornell aircraft.

No. 25 EFTS used the Fairchild Cornell as their training aircraft.

On 2 Dec 1944 No. 204 Reserve Equipment Maintenance Satellite(REMS) was established at the station. Other units located at Assiniboia until the end of the war in 1945 include No. 41 Pre-Aircrew Training School, and No. 403 Aircraft Holding Unit.

During World War II RCAF Station Assiniboia produced 2,496 pilots, the majority belonging to the RAF.  The station also had a relief (emergency) landing field, located near Lethburn, Saskatchewan.

Aerodrome information 
Three runways were listed as follows:

Relief landing field – Lethburn
The site was located east of the town of Assiniboia, Saskatchewan.  
The relief field was a square, turf, all way field measuring  x . 
A review of Google Maps satellite imagery on 7 June 2018 shows no details indicating a airfield at the listed coordinates.

Present day
The aerodrome is now the Assiniboia Airport.

See also 
List of airports in Saskatchewan

References 

Royal Canadian Air Force stations
Canadian Forces bases in Canada (closed)
Airports of the British Commonwealth Air Training Plan
Military history of Saskatchewan
Military airbases in Saskatchewan